Fairlie Pier railway station was a railway station serving the village of Fairlie, North Ayrshire, Scotland. The station allowed train passengers to link with ferry sailings to Great Cumbrae, Arran and the Isle of Bute.

History 
The station was opened on 1 July 1882 by the Glasgow and South Western Railway as part of the extension of the former Ardrossan Railway to Largs. As well as shipping services to Millport and Bute, the pier also handled services to and from Brodick during the winter months until the 1960s. The station officially closed on 31 July 1972, however the last train had run on 1 October 1971.

Today various sidings are situated around the station site as part of an MOD facility nearby, however they are overgrown and disused. Cumbrae services now run from a terminal in Largs.

References

Notes

Sources 
 
 

Disused railway stations in North Ayrshire
Former Glasgow and South Western Railway stations
Railway stations in Great Britain opened in 1882
Railway stations in Great Britain closed in 1972
Railway stations serving harbours and ports in the United Kingdom